Route 115 is a major east-west arterial route in the Winnipeg suburbs of St. Boniface and Transcona. It is the western extension of Manitoba Highway 15, which runs eastward to the communities of Dugald and Elma, Manitoba. Within the city boundaries it connects the largely industrial areas of south Transcona and east St. Boniface with Old St. Boniface and (via St. Mary's Road) downtown.

Route description
Route 115 begins at St. Mary's Road and runs eastward through Old St. Boniface as two one-way streets: Goulet Street for westbound traffic, Marion Street for eastbound traffic. The streets join together at their intersection with Rue Youville just west of the Seine River, and the two-way road continues as Marion Street eastward to Lagimodiere Boulevard. The route jogs north on Lagimodiere for approximately 450 meters before continuing eastward as Dugald Road, becoming Manitoba Highway 15 as it passes by the Perimeter Highway.

Goulet Street was named for Maxime Goulet, a member of the Legislative Assembly of Manitoba (MLA) in the 19th century. Marion Street was named for Roger Marion, mayor of St. Boniface from 1887 to 1889 and a Manitoba MLA.

Major intersections
From west to east:

References

115
Winnipeg 115